Ro4938581 is a nootropic drug invented in 2009 by a team working for Hoffmann-La Roche, which acts as a subtype-selective inverse agonist at the α5 subtype of the benzodiazepine binding site on the GABAA receptor. It has good selectivity for the α5 subtype and did not produce convulsant or anxiogenic effects in animal studies, making it a promising potential nootropic. Ro4938581 and a related derivative basmisanil (RG-1662, RO5186582) have subsequently been investigated for the alleviation of cognitive dysfunction in Down syndrome.

See also 
 GABAA receptor negative allosteric modulator
 GABAA receptor § Ligands

References 

Imidazobenzodiazepines
Triazolobenzodiazepines
GABAA receptor negative allosteric modulators
Nootropics